Elangbam Panthoi Chanu (born 1 February 1996) is an Indian footballer who plays as a goalkeeper for the Eastern Sporting Union and India football team.

Playing career
She represents Eastern Sporting Union in Indian Women's League since joining the club in 2016.

In December 2022, she along with Bala Devi, moved to Spain where they underwent training cum trial stint at the Spanish Segunda Federación outfit Málaga.

Honours

India
 SAFF Women's Championship: 2014, 2016
 South Asian Games Gold medal: 2016, 2019

Manipur
 Senior Women's National Football Championship: 2019–20

Individual
 Indian Women's League Best Goalkeeper: 2017–18

References

External links 
 Elangbam Panthoi Chanu at All India Football Federation
 

1996 births
Living people
Place of birth missing (living people)
Women's association football goalkeepers
India women's international footballers
India women's youth international footballers
21st-century Indian women
21st-century Indian people
Sportswomen from Manipur
Indian women's footballers
Footballers from Manipur
Eastern Sporting Union players
South Asian Games gold medalists for India
South Asian Games medalists in football
Indian Women's League players